Henry Eugene Hampton Jr. (8 January 1940 – 22 November 1998) was an African-American filmmaker. His production company, Blackside, Inc., produced over 80 programs—the most recognizable being the  documentary Eyes on the Prize, which won Emmy Awards, Peabody Awards, and was nominated for an Oscar. 

Blackside became one of the largest minority-owned non-theatrical film production companies in the U.S. during the mid-1970s and until his death in the late 1990s.

Biography

Early life and education 
Hampton was the son of surgeon Henry Hampton Sr. and Julia Veva Hampton, raised in Richmond Heights, Missouri, a suburb adjacent to the western edge of St. Louis. Henry lived on the eastern edge of an all-black working class community. His family converted to Catholicism after St Louis Archbishop Joseph Ritter led desegregation efforts in the region. 

Hampton attended Little Flower School and later the Jesuits' St. Louis University High School and College of the Holy Cross before studying literature at Washington University in St. Louis. He graduated from Wash U in 1961. Hampton attended medical school for a term at McGill University in Montreal, Quebec, before dropping out.

Career 
In 1965, while working for the Unitarian church as information director, Hampton went to Selma, Alabama, to participate in the Selma Marches (flying down on the same plane as James Reeb, the UU minister who would later be murdered during his trip). The marches changed Hampton's life, as he recognized the power of media and television and began to conceptualize a film documenting the Civil Rights Movement.

Three years later, in 1968 (while living in Roxbury, Boston), he founded Blackside, Inc., which offered "special expertise in the design and production of film and audio-visual products aimed at minority audiences." It became one of the largest minority-owned non-theatrical film production companies in the U.S. during the mid-1970s and until his death in the late 1990s. Hampton and his company produced over 80 programs including documentaries, television spots, and other media productions.

Blackside's primary business between 1968 and 1979 was the production of films, television and radio spots, television programming, and audio-visual educational packages. Blackside also produced public service announcements and film-based training materials for government and commercial clients. In 1977, the Harvard School of Design granted Hampton a Loeb Fellowship to study constitutional limitations and the nature of media and government information programs. His studies focused on consumers' and citizens' rights to information.

Hampton made a commitment to social justice with later productions, including his 1987 magnum opus Eyes on the Prize: America's Civil Rights Years (1954–1965). He followed this with a series of pieces, including Eyes on the Prize II: America at the Racial Crossroads 1965–mid 1980s; The Great Depression (1993); Malcolm X: Make It Plain (1994); America's War on Poverty (1995); Breakthrough: The Changing Face of Science in America (1997); I'll Make Me a World: A Century of African-American Arts (1999); Hopes on the Horizon: Africa in the 1990s (2001); This Far by Faith: African American Spiritual Journeys (2003).

He returned to WashU in 1989 to deliver the commencement speech.

Health issues and death
Hampton had contracted polio as a child. In his later years, he had lung cancer, the treatment for which led to myelodysplastic syndrome. 

He died at Brigham and Women's Hospital on November 22, 1998.

Legacy 
Hampton's film archive is held by the Washington University Film & Media Archive in St. Louis, Missouri. In addition to Hampton's films, the collection contains all of the elements that went into the production process such as interviews, stock footage, photographs, research, producer notes, scripts, and Hampton's personal papers.

Honorary degrees 
He was the recipient of over 10 honorary degrees including an Honorary Doctorate of Humanities from his alma mater (1989); St. Louis University (1988); Doctor of Arts, Northeastern University (1988); Suffolk University (1988); Bridgewater State College (1989); Brandeis University (1993); Boston College (1993); Emerson College (1995); Lincoln University (1996) and Tufts University (1996).

Awards 
Hampton and Blackside won many major awards in television broadcasting. They were recognized by organizations in the fields of journalism, history, and the arts.

7 Emmy Awards
One Academy Award nomination
George Foster Peabody Awards (multiple)
Ralph Lowell Award For Outstanding Contribution to Public Television(1993)
The first Harold C. Fleming Award for "a lifetime of service in the field of political participation and community education against hatred in politics." (1994).
The 1st Annual Heinz Award in the Arts and Humanities (1995)
International Documentary Association Career Achievement Award
Erik Barnouw Award, Organization of American Historians
John Stoneman Rena Award, Outstanding contributions to the motion picture industry
The DuPont Columbia Award, Excellence in Broadcast Journalism (multiple)
Edward R. Murrow Brotherhood Award
Who's Who in America: Fifty-second Edition
African-American Achievement Award, City of Boston, For Excellence in the Arts
PBS Salute, Prism Award: Lifetime of Achievement award

Filmography
America's War on Poverty (5-part series)
Boston Black United Front
Breakthrough: The Changing Face of Science in America (6-part series)
Code Blue
Crisis to Crisis: Voices of a Divided City
Easy Street
Eyes on the Prize (14-part series) 
Eyes on the Prize I: America's Civil Rights Years 1954-1965
Eyes on the Prize II: America at the Racial Crossroads 1965-1985
The Great Depression (7-part series)
Head Start to Confidence
Hopes on the Horizon: Africa in the 1990s
I'll Make Me A World: A Century of African American Arts (6-part series)
In Search of Help: Welfare or Survivor's Benefits
Kinfolks
Malcolm X: Make It Plain
This Far By Faith: African American Spiritual Journeys (6-part series)
Reorganizing the Nation's Hospitals (1975)

Organizations
In addition to his work with Blackside Inc., Hampton was involved in a number of other organizations, including:

Museum of Afro-American History in Boston, Chair of the Board.
Children's Defense Fund, board member.
Boston Center for the Arts, board member.
Beacon Press, Advisory Board.
Unitarian Universalist Association, Director of Information (1963–1968).

Notes

External links
 Blackside Film & Video Production 
 Henry Hampton Collection at Washington University in St. Louis
 
 Eyes on the Prize Interview Transcripts - Washington University in St. Louis
 A Tribute to Henry Hampton (By Andrea L. Taylor)
 PBS BreakThrough Bio 
 African American Registry: Henry Hampton

1940 births
1998 deaths
African-American film directors
American documentary film directors
Harvard Graduate School of Design alumni
National Humanities Medal recipients
Washington University in St. Louis alumni
African-American Catholics
Emmy Award winners
Peabody Award winners